Borisovskaya is a rural locality (a village) in Korobitsynskoye Rural Settlement, Syamzhensky District, Vologda Oblast, Russia. The population was 32 as of 2002.

Geography 
Borisovskaya is located 37 km northeast of Syamzha (the district's administrative centre) by road. Yeskino is the nearest rural locality.

References 

Rural localities in Syamzhensky District